The Sisypheans is the fourth studio album by Australian band Xylouris White. It was released on 8 November 2019 under Drag City.

The album is named after the Ancient Greek king, Sisyphus.

Critical reception
The Sisypheans was met with generally favourable reviews from critics. At Metacritic, which assigns a weighted average rating out of 100 to reviews from mainstream publications, this release received an average score of 77, based on 5 reviews.

Track listing

References

2019 albums
Drag City (record label) albums
Xylouris White albums